Orussus is a genus of parasitic wood wasps in the family Orussidae. There are about 30 described species in Orussus.

Species

 Orussus abietinus (Scopoli, 1763)
 Orussus afer Guiglia, 1937
 Orussus areolatus Blank & Vilhelmsen, 2014
 Orussus bensoni Guiglia, 1937
 Orussus boninensis Yasumatsu, 1954
 Orussus brunneus Shinohara & Smith, 1983
 Orussus coreanus Takeuchi, 1938
 Orussus decoomani Maa, 1950
 Orussus hanumanus Vilhelmsen & Blank, 2014
 Orussus japonicus Tosawa, 1930
 Orussus loriae Mantero, 1899
 Orussus melanosoma Lee & Wei, 2014
 Orussus minutus Middlekauff, 1983
 Orussus moroi Guiglia, 1954
 Orussus occidentalis Cresson, 1879
 Orussus punctulatissimus Blank & Vilhelmsen, 2014
 Orussus rufipes Tsuneki, 1963
 Orussus sayii Westwood, 1835
 Orussus schoutedeni Guiglia, 1937
 Orussus scutator (Benson, 1955)
 Orussus smithi Blank, Kraus & Taeger, 2006
 Orussus spinifer (Benson, 1955)
 Orussus striatus Maa, 1950
 Orussus taorminensis Trautmann, 1922
 Orussus terminalis Newman, 1838
 Orussus tessmanni Enslin, 1913
 Orussus thoracicus Ashmead, 1898
 Orussus unicolor Latreille, 1812
 Orussus zhui Vilhelmsen, Liu, Smith & Blank, 2014

References

Further reading

External links

 

Sawflies